Anaxander or Anaxandros was the 12th Agiad dynasty King of Sparta (ruled c. 640–615 BC).

He was the son of King Eurycrates and father of King Eurycratides.

His grandson was King Leon of Sparta.

Anaxander is mentioned by famous persons, including Tyrtaeus (a poet) and Pausanias (geographer).

References

External links

7th-century BC rulers
7th-century BC Spartans
Agiad kings of Sparta
7th-century BC deaths
Year of birth unknown